Santa Cruz is a district in the northern part of the City of Manila, Philippines, located on the right bank of the Pasig River near its mouth, bordered by the districts of Tondo, Binondo, Quiapo, and Sampaloc, as well as the areas of Grace Park and Barrio San Jose in Caloocan and the district of La Loma in Quezon City. The district belongs to the 3rd congressional district of Manila.

History

Spanish colonial era
Prior to the arrival of the Spanish conquistadors to the Philippine Islands, the district of Santa Cruz was partly a marshland, patches of greeneries, orchards and partly rice fields. A Spanish expedition in 1581 claimed the territory and awarded to the Society of Jesus whose members are known as 'Jesuits'.

The Jesuits built the first Roman Catholic church in the area where the present Santa Cruz Parish stands on June 20, 1619. The Jesuits enshrined the image of the Our Lady of The Pillar in 1643 to serve the pre-dominantly Chinese residents in the area. The image drew a lot of devotees and a popular cult grew around it.

At the Santa Cruz Parish, a small park was built that linked the area into the headquarters of the Spanish cavalry, the building that once was the Colegio de San Ildefonso, operated by the Jesuits. The district in the Spanish times also had a slaughter house and a meat market and up north was the Chinese cemetery.

The Franciscan fathers were given the responsibility to care for the lepers of the city and specifically the San Lazaro Hospital. Father Felix Huerta developed San Lazaro into a refuge for the afflicted and it became a famous home for those afflicted in the north side of the Pasig River.

World War II
During World War II, the Japanese occupational forces, caught unaware of the fast approaching liberation by the combined American & Filipino soldiers from the north, abandoned in 1945 the northern banks of the Pasig River including Santa Cruz. Santa Cruz and much of the northern portions of Manila were spared from the artillery bombardment and to date, a number of pre-World War II buildings and houses still stand in Santa Cruz.

When the Philippine republic was finally established in July 1946, the San Lazaro Hospital complex became the head office of the country’s Department of Health.

Notable buildings

Santa Cruz Church 

The first Santa Cruz Church was built when the Arrabal (Suburb) of Santa Cruz was established by the Jesuits in the early 1600s. The church had undergone many repairs and reconstruction, with the last reconstruction done in the 1950s. Today, the church architecture employs a California Spanish Mission style facade silhouette with the usual Filipino (Asian-Hispanic mix) Baroque ornamentation. The church facade is topped with an effigy statue of Our Lady of the Pillar, the patroness of the church whose feast happens every third Sunday of October and on the 12th day of October.

Cemeteries 
Santa Cruz is home to Manila's oldest cemeteries located in the district's northern section namely, La Loma Cemetery (shared with Caloocan), the Manila Chinese Cemetery, and the city's biggest, the Manila North Cemetery.

Main thoroughfares

Rizal Avenue is the main thoroughfare in the district. The district is also accessible via the following roads:
 Recto Avenue
 Tayuman Street
 Blumentritt Road

Stations of the LRT Line 1 located in Santa Cruz are Carriedo (shared with Quiapo), Doroteo Jose, Bambang, Tayuman and Blumentritt (shared with Tondo). The Philippine National Railways has a station in Blumentritt. Jeepneys coming from Baclaran, Pasay, Valenzuela, Novaliches and Caloocan pass through Rizal Avenue.

Barangays

Santa Cruz has 82 barangays.

Sub-districts
Barangays

Santa Cruz has two postal codes corresponding to its two sub-districts: 1014 for Santa Cruz North and 1003 for Santa Cruz South.

Gallery

Religious buildings

Civic institutions

Commercial establishments

Residences

See also

 Spanish East Indies
 Spanish Filipino
 Philippine Spanish
 Chavacano
 Captaincy General of the Philippines

References

External links

https://brgy.info/zipcodes/1014_manila.php
https://brgy.info/zipcodes/1003_manila.php

 
Districts of Manila
1619 establishments in the Spanish Empire
Populated places established in 1619